Miles Jenkins (born 27 December 1994 in Chichester) is an English professional squash player. As of February 2018, he was ranked number 165 in the world.

References

1994 births
Living people
English male squash players
Sportspeople from Chichester